Tynda Sigikta Airport  is an airport in Russia located 16 km north of Tynda. It is an intermediate class of airfield with several large buildings, probably capable of handling jet traffic.

History
The history of the airport as a standalone runway built during the World War II years, where American planes which flown from Alaska stopped to refuel.

As the airport opened in 1965, to October 26, 1974, opens regular flights from Komsomolsk-on-Amur - Chegdomyn - Tynda. Over 1974 passengers were sent to 6592, and in connection with the construction of the Baikal–Amur Mainline by 1975 the airport already  23,830 passengers passed in the airport. From 1988 to 1992 the reconstruction was taking place with the construction of the terminal, which includes a terminal with a capacity of 100 people per hour, ticket hall, snack bar, lounge with 500 seats, lounges, navigation and meteorological service. the runway has been increased to 1923 meters (the project up to 3000 m).

Airlines and destinations

References
RussianAirFields.com

Airports built in the Soviet Union
Airports in Amur Oblast